Departure is a 2019 suspense drama television series created by Vince Shiao. It was commissioned by Canadian broadcaster Global and United States streaming service Peacock and produced by Shaftesbury Films. Starring Archie Panjabi and Christopher Plummer and directed by T. J. Scott, the series premiered on Universal TV on 10 July 2019, with Global scheduling the Canadian debut for 8 October 2020. During the first season's release in Canada and the UK, the series averaged more than one million viewers per episode.

In 2021, the series was renewed for a third season, with Eric McCormack joining the cast. That year, the series was nominated for a Canadian Screen Award for Best Dramatic Series.

Cast

Transport Safety and Investigations Bureau personnel:

 Archie Panjabi as Kendra Malley: a TSIB investigator and lead investigator looking into the crash of Flight 716
 Christopher Plummer as Howard Lawson: the senior manager of the TSIB and Kendra's mentor (seasons 1–2)
 Kris Holden-Ried as Dominic Hayes: a TSIB investigator and Kendra's partner
 Florence Ordesh as Rose Tate
 Peter Mensah as Levi Hall: a senior TSIB investigator
 Claire Forlani as Janet Friel: an MI5 officer assigned to the investigation
 Tamara Duarte as Nadia: a TSIB investigator
 Mark Rendall as Theo: a TSIB investigator

British Global Airlines Flight 716 crew and passengers:

 Allan Hawco as Richard Donovan: the pilot of Flight 716
 Tyler Fayose as Arthur Delaney: the co-pilot of Flight 716
 Chloe Farnworth as Leah Sims: a flight attendant on Flight 716
 Rebecca Liddiard as Madelyn Strong: the sole survivor of Flight 716
 Kristian Bruun as Daniel Hoffman: a passenger on Flight 716
 Emilio Doorgasingh as Hassan Esmaili: a former Iranian terrorist and secret Israeli double agent, who is a passenger on Flight 716

Additional characters:
 Emmanuel Kabongo as The Orderly
 Alexandre Bourgeois as AJ Malley: Kendra's adopted son
 Shazad Latif as Ali Basra: Madelyn Strong's boyfriend
Evan Buliung as Derek Strong: Madelyn Strong's father
 Sasha Roiz as Pavel Bartok: An oligarch and the CEO of Bartok Airways
 Chantelle Han as Su-Lin Donovan: Richard Donovan's wife
 Ryan Pierce as Hugh Keehlar: Richard Donovan's secret husband
 Dougray Scott as Ethan Moreau: the CEO of British Global Air
 Mark Lutz as Gavin Malley: Kendra's late husband
 Paris Jefferson as Gillian Malley: Gavin's sister

Production

First season
Location filming took place in several cities of Ontario, including Cambridge, Hamilton, and Toronto, in 2018. In Cambridge, the city hall was used to represent Scotland Yard and Cambridge University. In January 2019, filming shifted to London in the United Kingdom. Principal photography was completed in 40 days.

Second season
Departure was renewed for a second season on 11 September 2020. Production was already underway by 20 September 2020.

Christopher Plummer filmed his scenes from his home in Connecticut instead of traveling to the sets in Toronto due to travel restrictions into Canada owing to the COVID-19 pandemic. Plummer died on 5 February 2021 but was able to complete filming his scenes for the second season shortly before his death. Plummer's work in the second season was his final on-screen performance before his death.

Episodes

Series overview

Season 1 (2020)
This season follows the investigation by the fictional Transport Safety and Investigations Bureau into the disappearance of a British passenger plane over the Atlantic Ocean and the reasons behind it.

Season 2 (2021)
The plot featured an investigation of the crash of an automated high-speed train travelling to Chicago from Toronto. The accident leaves multiple deaths in its wake and a web of potential suspects which include, in addition to possible mechanical or software errors, the tech visionary who invented the train's control system; an anti-technology politician, and an FBI prisoner who disappears after the crash. When the feds swoop in to initiate a manhunt, Kendra's investigation evolves from finding the causes of the crash to working with federal agents to capture the fugitive.

Broadcast and release
NBCUniversal pre-bought the series to air it on Universal TV in the United Kingdom and Germany and on 13th Street in Czech Republic, Denmark, France, Ukraine, and Spain, as well as on Universal TV in Africa and 13th Street in Poland. On 14 July 2020, NBC's streaming service Peacock acquired the series in the United States, where it debuted on 17 September 2020. The distributor is Red Arrow Studios International, although Starlings Television managed the sale to Peacock/Universal. The NBCUniversal media conglomerate purchased the series for distribution in Europe and Africa.

The second season of Departure was released on Peacock in the United States on 5 August 2021 and in the United Kingdom on Sky Witness.

Reception
The Hollywood Reporter was impressed with some aspects of the series but concluded its review noting the series had: "just enough enticing elements to pique curiosity, but [lacked] the execution needed to actually be good". The Variety review was quite positive and particularly praised Panjabi and Plummer in a "drama that punches above its weight". Based on viewing the first two episodes, the Toronto Star reviewer commented that "the action is as taut and absorbing as any detective thriller".

In 2021, the series was nominated for a Canadian Screen Award for Best Dramatic Series.

References

External links
 

2019 British television series debuts
2020 Canadian television series debuts
2010s British drama television series
2020s British drama television series
2010s British mystery television series
2020s British mystery television series
2010s Canadian drama television series
2020s Canadian drama television series
Canadian mystery television series
Global Television Network original programming
Aviation television series
Disaster television series
Television shows about aviation accidents or incidents